The Minister in the Presidency is a Minister in the Cabinet of South Africa and is chosen by the President of South Africa. 

The minister is responsible for all portfolios within the Office of the President of South Africa.

The current Minister in the Presidency is Khumbudzo Ntshavheni, who was appointed to the position in March 2023.

Functions and responsibilities
The Minister in the Presidency has political responsibility for the Department of Planning, Monitoring and Evaluation, Statistics South Africa, the Government Communication and Information System, the Media Development and Diversity Agency, Brand South Africa and the State Security Agency.

Ministers

Ministers in The Presidency, 1999–2009

Minister in the Presidency for the National Planning Commission, 2009–2014

Minister in the Presidency for Performance Monitoring and Evaluation as well as Administration in the Presidency, 2009–2014

Minister in the Presidency, 2014–present

References

External links
The Presidency

Lists of political office-holders in South Africa